Forstertyna is a genus of spiders in the family Megadictynidae. It was first described in 1995 by Harvey. , it contains only one species, Forstertyna marplesi, from New Zealand.

References

Monotypic Araneomorphae genera
Spiders of New Zealand
Megadictynidae